Bruce Crane (July 27, 1909 – June 2, 1985)  was an American businessman and politician who was president and chairman of Crane & Co. and a member of the Massachusetts Governor's Council.

Early life
Crane was born in Dalton, Massachusetts to Winthrop Murray Crane and Josephine Porter Boardman. He attended Dalton public schools and the Groton School. In 1931, he graduated from Yale University.

Political career
Crane was a member of the Dalton Finance Committee and from 1946 to 1951 served on the Dalton School Committee. From 1953 to 1957 he represented the 8th District on the Massachusetts Governor's Council. From 1964 to 1980 he was a member of the Republican National Committee.

Business career
After graduating from Yale, Crane went to work at his family's company, Crane & Co., which made paper for the United States Treasury. From 1951 to 1975, Crane was president at Crane & Co. He retired as president in 1975, but remained chairman until his death in 1985.

Personal life and death
In 1932, Crane married Winnie Davis Long. The couple moved into Sugar Hill, his parents' home in Dalton that had been unoccupied since his mother moved out in 1924. The couple had twin daughters, Winnie and Davis, born in March 1935.

Crane died on June 2, 1985 at the Berkshire Medical Center in Pittsfield, Massachusetts at the age of 75.

Winnie Crane remained at Sugar Hill until her death in 1991, even though she reportedly never liked the house. Sugar Hill is now a senior living community.

References

1909 births
1985 deaths
Members of the Massachusetts Governor's Council
People from Dalton, Massachusetts
Yale University alumni
20th-century American businesspeople
Massachusetts Republicans
20th-century American politicians
Burials at Main Street Cemetery (Dalton, Massachusetts)
Crane family